Heliothis conifera is a species of moth of the family Noctuidae first described by George Hampson in 1913. It is found in Africa, including South Africa.

External links
 

Endemic moths of South Africa
Heliothis
Moths described in 1913